The Men's J. P. Morgan Tournament of Champions 2011 is the men's edition of the 2011 Tournament of Champions, which is a PSA World Series event Gold (Prize money: $115,000). The event took place at the Grand Central Terminal in New York City in the United States from 21 January to 27 January. Ramy Ashour won his second Tournament of Champions trophy, beating Nick Matthew in the final.

Prize money and ranking points
For 2011, the prize purse was $115,000. The prize money and points breakdown is as follows:

Seeds

Draw and results

See also
Tournament of Champions (squash)
PSA World Series 2011

References

External links
PSA Tournament of Champions 2011 website
Tournament of Champions official website

Tournament of Champions (squash)
Men's Tournament of Champions
Men's Tournament of Champions